Temporary Pleasure is the second album by Simian Mobile Disco. It was released in the United Kingdom on 17 August 2009. It was available in LP, CD and deluxe limited edition CD formats.

History
The album was recorded throughout 2008 and 2009 in the band's studio in East London by James Ford and Damon Albarn, the Blur frontman. Taking time during their world tour of DJing and performing live, they recorded with guests such as Beth Ditto (from Gossip) and Alexis Taylor (from Hot Chip). This was preceded by the release of a new single "Audacity of Huge" (featuring Chris Keating from Yeasayer) on 3 August 2009. Prior to its release, the band streamed a low quality version of the single on their official website from 22 May 2009.

Track listing
Standard edition

Limited edition second disc

Extra Temporary/Extra Pleasure
Both of these titles refer to the same release of the four bonus tracks included in the limited edition of the Temporary Pleasure studio album. Yet the track listing differs slightly on the Beatport version, on which is featured a new studio recording of "Belvedere" as well as a remix of the first track.

Charts

References

External links
Official Simian Mobile Disco website

2009 albums
Simian Mobile Disco albums
Albums produced by James Ford (musician)
Wichita Recordings albums